Kremnitz is a river of Bavaria, Germany. It is the right headwater of the Kronach, near Wilhelmsthal.

See also
List of rivers of Bavaria

Rivers of Bavaria
Rivers of Germany